Mary Estill Buchanan (born November 15, 1934) is an American politician who served as the Secretary of State of Colorado from 1974 to 1983. She was the Republican nominee for U.S. Senate in 1980, but was defeated by incumbent Gary Hart.

References

1934 births
Colorado Republicans
Living people
Secretaries of State of Colorado
Wellesley College alumni
Harvard Business School alumni